Sekolah Menegah Atas 2 Wonosari is a high school in Wonosari, Gunung Kidul Regency. In 2010, it had a graduation rate of 93%, well above the regional average.

References

Schools in Indonesia
Education in the Special Region of Yogyakarta